Mary Shawn Copeland (born August 24, 1947), known professionally as M. Shawn Copeland, is a retired American womanist and Black Catholic theologian, and a former religious sister. She is professor emerita of systematic theology at Boston College and is known for her work in theological anthropology as well as political theology.

Biography 
An only child, Copeland grew up in Detroit, Michigan. She received her B.A. in English in 1969 from Madonna College in Michigan before becoming a Felician religious sister. After she became involved in protests against the Archdiocese of Detroit's attempts to close Black Catholic schools, she felt pressure from within her order and transferred to the Adrian Dominican Sisters in 1971. She completed her PhD in systematic theology in 1991 from Boston College, and left religious life in 1994.

Copeland has held posts at Xavier University of Louisiana, Yale Divinity School, and Marquette University. She worked as an adjunct professor in the Department of Theology at Boston College for a number of years, and joined in 2003 as Associate Professor of Systematic Theology.

From 2003 to 2004, Copeland was the first African American to serve as president of the Catholic Theological Society of America (CTSA). From 2001 to 2005, Copeland was also the convenor of the Black Catholic Theological Symposium (BCTS).

In 2007, Copeland gave the Madeleva Lecture at St. Mary's College (Indiana).

She became a full professor at BC in 2013, retiring and becoming Professor Emerita in 2019. In October of that same year, she delivered the Cunningham Lectures in New College, University of Edinburgh, on the topic "Theology as Political: The Weight, the Yearning, the Urgency of Life."
In 2020, she began a one-year term as the Alonzo L. McDonald Family Chair on the Life and Teachings of Jesus and Their Impact on Culture at Emory University. As part of her term, she delivered public lectures in Fall 2020 and Spring 2021.

She gave the keynote at the CTSA gathering in June that year. She delivered the keynote at the BCTS gathering the same year, in the fall at the University of Notre Dame.

Honors 
In 2018, Copeland became the first African American theologian honored with the prestigious John Courtney Murray Award, the Catholic Theological Society of America's highest honor. A festschrift was also produced that year in honor of Copeland, entitled Enfleshing Theology.

Controversy 
In 2017, a lecture of Copeland's at Madonna University was canceled after conservative Catholic media outlets (including Church Militant) published articles critiquing Copeland's stance on LGBT issues, which has at times been in conflict with official Church teachings.

Works

References 

1947 births
Living people
Boston College alumni
Boston College faculty
African-American theologians
Religious studies scholars
Women Christian theologians
Womanist theologians
20th-century American Roman Catholic theologians
21st-century American Roman Catholic theologians
Political theologians
Madonna University alumni
Presidents of the Catholic Theological Society of America
African-American Catholics
20th-century African-American writers
21st-century African-American writers
20th-century African-American women writers
20th-century American women writers
21st-century African-American women writers
21st-century American women writers